Wallacepur is a village in the Ghogha Taluka of Bhavnagar district, Gujarat, India. It was founded in the 19th century and became the only all-Christian village in Gujarat.

History 
The Ghogha Christian mission was initiated by the Reverend James McKee in 1844 and was a part of the Kathiawar and Gujarat mission establishment started and supported by the Irish Presbyterian Mission.

The village was laid out and most of the houses were built by Beatty. He also built a church with a bell in 1871. The village was named after James Wallace, who had been appointed a missionary at Ghogha in 1845 and later at Surat. Wallace had retranslated scriptures, and written an educational textbook and some Gujarati tracts.

Additions to the village were made by the Reverend George T. Rea, who was in charge of the mission afterwards. In 1871, a number of Christians came from Gujarat and settled. At the time, there were eight houses, a church with a bell, a resthouse, a missionaries house, a public well, and a cattle pond.

Most of the villagers were Hindu and later adopted Christianity.

Demographics 
The village has a population of around 500 people, all of whom are literate. It is the only all-Christian village in Gujarat and all the residents are Protestants. Most men are engaged in farming, while many women have taken up roles as nurses, teachers, and clerks in nearby villages and Bhavnagar.

Disputes are settled internally and the village has been crime-free for years. Wallacepur has also been the recipient of the district council's cleanest village awards. The village has a reciprocal arrangement with the nearby village of Kareda, with residents of both attending each other's religious festivals.

References

Further reading
Church of North India, Gujarat Archives

Villages in Bhavnagar district
Christianity in Gujarat
Populated places established in the 19th century